Lloyd Haft (born November 9, 1946, in Sheboygan, Wisconsin, USA) is an American-born Dutch poet, translator, and sinologist. He has been living in the Netherlands since 1968. Haft was educated at Harvard College and Leiden University. His translations into Dutch include works by Wallace Stevens and Hart Crane. He has translated Herman Gorter, Gerrit Kouwenaar, H. H. ter Balkt, Anton Ent, Bian Zhilin, Zhou Mengdie, Yang Lingye, and Lo Fu into English.

Awards
 Ida Gerhardt Poëzieprijs for De Psalmen (2004)
 Jan Campert Prize for Atlantis (1994)

Bibliography

Books in English (selection) 

 2022 − Zhou Mengdie: 41 Poems
 2021 − Herman Gorter: Selected Poems

 2006 – Zhou Mengdie's Poetry of Consciousness
 2005 - Formosa (bilingual Dutch-English)
 2002 - Where does old light go? / Wohin geht altes Licht 
 2000 – The Chinese Sonnet. Meanings of a Form
 1998 – Where is the body that will hold?
 1997 − A Guide to Chinese Literature (with Wilt Idema)
 1996 – Anthropos (bilingual Dutch-English)
 1993 – Atlantis (bilingual Dutch-English)

 1981 – Pien Chih-lin (revised 1983, second printing, 2011)

Books in Dutch (selection) 

 2018 − Intocht
 2017 − Lau-tze's vele wegen
 2008 − Deze poelen, deze geest
 2005 − Formosa (bilingual Dutch-English)
 2003 − De Psalmen in de bewerking van Lloyd Haft (fourth printing 2011)
 1996 − Anthropos (bilingual Dutch-English)
 1993 − Atlantis (bilingual Dutch-English)
 1985 − Slakkehuis
 1982 − Ikonen bij daglicht

References

1946 births
Living people
Dutch male poets
Dutch sinologists
Dutch translators
American emigrants to the Netherlands
Chinese–English translators
Dutch–English translators
English–Dutch translators
Harvard College alumni
Leiden University alumni
Academic staff of Leiden University
People from Sheboygan, Wisconsin
Writers from Wisconsin